Lyclene quadrata is a moth of the subfamily Arctiinae. It was described by Jeremy Daniel Holloway in 2001. It is found on Borneo and possibly Peninsular Malaysia. The habitat consists of lowland and lower montane forests, as well as coastal localities and areas of disturbed forest.

The length of the forewings is 7–8 mm.

References

Nudariina
Moths described in 2001
Moths of Asia